Interpellation is a formal request of a parliament to the respective government. It is distinguished from question time in that it often involves a separate procedure.  In many parliaments, each individual member of parliament has the right to submit questions (possibly a limited amount during a certain period) to a member of the government. The respective minister or secretary is then required to respond and to justify government policy. Interpellation thus allows the parliament to supervise the government's activity. In this sense, it is closer to a motion of censure. In English, the parliamentary questioning sense of "interpellation" dates from the late 19th century.  It has been adopted from French constitutional discourse.

In some countries, for example Finland, Slovenia and Lithuania, interpellations are more or less synonymous with a motion of no confidence because they are automatically connected with a vote of confidence and their express purpose is to determine the confidence enjoyed by the government or a minister. In Finland, the government must reply to an interpellation in a plenary session within 15 days. After receiving the reply to the interpellation, parliament debates the matter and proceeds to vote on whether the government or a particular minister enjoys the confidence of Parliament.

See also
 Question time
 Question Hour
 Motion of no confidence
 Prime minister's questions

References

Data collection
Incidental motions
Westminster system